Duke Ding of Qi (reigned c. 10th century BC) was the second recorded ruler of the ancient Chinese state of Qi during the Western Zhou Dynasty.  His personal name was Lü Ji (呂伋) and ancestral name was Jiang (姜).

According to classical Chinese texts such as the Records of the Grand Historian and Zuo Zhuan, Duke Ding succeeded his father Lü Shang, Duke Tai of Qi, who was said to have been a centenarian.  Duke Ding supposedly served King Kang of Zhou along with other major vassal state rulers including Xiong Yi, viscount of Chu, Count Kang of Wey (衞康伯), Xie, Marquis of Jin and Boqin, Duke of Lu.  However, most modern historians believe Duke Ding was in fact the fifth-generation descendant of Duke Tai, and he could not have served King Kang of Zhou.

After Duke Ding died, he was succeeded by his son Duke Yǐ of Qi.

Family
Wives:
 The mother of Crown Prince Dexing and Prince De

Sons:
 Prince Heng, the progenitor of the Nie lineage
 Served as the Minister of War of Wey
 Fourth son, Crown Prince Dexing, the progenitor of the Cui lineage and the father of Count Mu of Cui
 Prince De (d. 933 BC), ruled as Duke Yǐ of Qi from 974–933 BC
 A son who ruled as the Count of Yi

Ancestry

References

Monarchs of Qi (state)
10th-century BC Chinese monarchs